Farmdale is an unincorporated community in southwestern Kinsman Township, Trumbull County, Ohio, United States.  It has a post office with the ZIP code 44417.

The community is part of the Youngstown–Warren–Boardman, OH-PA Metropolitan Statistical Area.

References

Unincorporated communities in Trumbull County, Ohio
Unincorporated communities in Ohio